Barry M. Usher is an American politician serving as a member of the Montana House of Representatives from the 40th district. Elected in November 2016, he assumed office in January 2017. Since January 2021, Usher has served as the majority whip of the House.

Career
Usher previously served in the United States Coast Guard on the USCGC Steadfast (WMEC-623) and became a Boatswain Mate 2nd Class. He also worked in law enforcement before establishing a small business. Usher and his wife, Ann Marie Murphy Usher, have four children. Usher lives in Yellowstone County, Montana.

References

1965 births
Living people
Republican Party members of the Montana House of Representatives
People from Yellowstone County, Montana
Politicians from Billings, Montana
University of Maryland Global Campus alumni
United States Coast Guard non-commissioned officers